Neopreptos is a genus of moths in the family Eupterotidae.

Species
 Neopreptos clazomenia Druce, 1886
 Neopreptos marathusa Druce, 1886

References

Eupterotinae
Moth genera